Sacculus may refer to:
 Saccule, a bed of sensory cells in the inner ear
 Sacculus (entomology), a sensory organ in the antenna of certain insects
 Sacculus, a sac of peptidoglycan that has been purified from a gram-negative bacterium
 Sacculus, the Latin word for money bag